Stories of Joy is a compilation of five short films directed by upcoming filmmakers as a contribution to the ‘Joy of Giving Week’, a philanthropic festival celebrated across India from 2 October to 8 October every year. The first screening of the compilation was on 19 October 2013 at National Film Archives of India, Pune. This project was well received and appreciated by the media. Produced by 7th Std. Motion Pictures and Flying Horse Studios. The music was composed by Gandhaar and films are edited by Shreyas Kulkarni.

The films are:
 Chaiwala, directed by Shreyas Kulkarni and Yogesh Jagam
 A Joy Unbound, directed by Vaibhav Khisti
 Chor, directed by Swapnil Kumawat and Prasad Bhardwaja
 Dodka, directed by Vikrant Pawa
 The Last One, directed by Noopur Bora

References

2013 films
Indian short films
Indian anthology films